Aleksandra Lange "Shura" Baryshnikov (born March 5, 1981) is an American dancer, choreographer, dance educator, and actress.

Early life 
Aleksandra Lange Baryshnikov is the daughter of ballet dancer Mikhail Baryshnikov and actress Jessica Lange. She is of Finnish descent through her maternal grandmother. She has five half-siblings; three on her father's side, including actress Anna Baryshnikov, and two on her mother's side. Baryshnikov trained in classical ballet as a child, and grew up accompanying her mother to different filming locations. In high school Baryshnikov competed in diving, ran track, rode horses, and played field hockey. She went on to attend Marlboro College in Vermont, where she majored in American studies and also studied theatre and contemporary dance. While at Marlboro she was a member of the student a cappella group Five-O'Clock Bells.

Career 
Baryshnikov is the head of Movement at the Brown University / Trinity Repertory Company MFA Program in Acting and Directing as well as a teaching associate in the Department of Theatre Arts and Performance Studies at Brown University, teaching contact improvisation, movement, and dance. She has worked as a choreographer and movement consultant for Trinity Repertory Company, The Wilbury Theatre Group, and Elemental Theatre Collective. As a freelance dancer, she has performed in works by Heidi Henderson, Ali Kenner-Brodsky and Betsy Miller. She has also danced with Aerplaye Dance, American Dance Legacy Initiative, Festival Ballet Providence, Bridge Rep of Boston, Elemental Theatre Collective and Lostwax Multimedia Dance. She is on the faculty at Festival Ballet Providence School and has taught movement at Earthdance in Plainfield, Massachusetts, and at Salve Regina University, Connecticut College, Dean College, Rhode Island College, and MIT. She is also a dance teacher at the Moses Brown School. She trained in Viewpoints improvisational techniques with the SITI Company under Anne Bogart. She is a member of Actors' Equity Association. Baryshnikov is the co-founder, along with Danielle Davidson, of the Doppelganger Dance Collective.

She starred in a production of Oscar Wilde's Salome at Boston's Bridge Repertory Theater and was a cast member in Trinity Rep's production of the musical Oklahoma! She played Orlando in Gamm Theatre's 2018 production of As You Like It.

Her performance work has been presented by the RISD Museum, Providence Fringe Festival, the Institute at Brown for Environment and Society, and in the Moving Arts Lab at Earthdance.

References 

Living people
1981 births
21st-century American dancers
21st-century American actresses
Actresses from Rhode Island
American women choreographers
American choreographers
American female dancers
American contemporary dancers
Shura
Place of birth missing (living people)
American stage actresses
Dance teachers
Brown University faculty
Salve Regina University faculty
Connecticut College faculty
Rhode Island College faculty
MIT School of Humanities, Arts, and Social Sciences faculty
Dancers from Rhode Island
Dancers from Minnesota
American people of Finnish descent
American women academics